The Avenger, Zorro is a 1972 Spanish-Italian Western film written and directed by Rafael Romero Marchent.

Plot

Cast 
 Fabio Testi as Don Diego / Zorro
 Carlos Romero Marchent as Fred MacAslim
 Frank Braña as Dominguez
 Simone Blondell as Perla Dominguez 
 Piero Lulli as Bill Warner
 Andrés Mejuto as Brook
 Eduardo Calvo as Richter
 Luis Induni as Sheriff
 Riccardo Garrone

Release
The Avenger, Zorro was released on 21 February 1972.

Footnotes

Sources

External links
 

1972 films
1972 Western (genre) films
Films based on works by Johnston McCulley
Films directed by Rafael Romero Marchent
Films scored by Lallo Gori
Films with screenplays by Rafael Romero Marchent
Italian Western (genre) films
Spanish Western (genre) films
Zorro films
1970s American films
1970s Italian films